Dasychira mescalera is a species of moth of the family Erebidae first described by Alexander Douglas Campbell Ferguson in 1978. It is found in New Mexico, Texas and Colorado.

References

Lymantriinae
Moths described in 1978